Pangako sa 'Yo ( / ) is a 2015 television series and is a remake of the 2000 television series of the same name. The series is directed by Rory Quintos, Dado Lumibao and Olivia Lamasan and starring  Kathryn Bernardo and Daniel Padilla with Jodi Sta. Maria, Angelica Panganiban and Ian Veneracion.

Series Overview

Episodes

Book 1: Season 1 (2015)

July 2015

August 2015

September 2015

October 2015

November 2015

Book Two

November 2015

December 2015

January 2016

February 2016

References

Lists of Philippine drama television series episodes